Steinhauser Rottum (also: Untere Rottum) is a river in Baden-Württemberg, Germany. At its confluence with the Bellamonter Rottum in Ochsenhausen, the Rottum is formed.

See also
List of rivers of Baden-Württemberg

Rivers of Baden-Württemberg
Rivers of Germany